Begumpet railway station (station code:BMT) is a railway station and railway junction in Begumpet, Secunderabad, India. It falls under the common capital area shared between the state of Telangana. Localities like Ameerpet, Greenlands and Somajiguda are accessible from this station.

Lines

Hyderabad Multi-Modal Transport System
Lingampalli–Hyderabad route (MMTS, Hyderabad) 
Falaknuma–Lingampalli route (MMTS, Hyderabad) via Secunderabad (FS line)

Superfast trains with stops
12025/26 Pune–Secunderabad Shatabdi Express
12591/92 Gorakhpur–Yesvantpur Express
12701/02 Hyderabad–Mumbai CST Hussainsagar Express
12735/36 Secunderabad–Yesvantpur Garib Rath Express
12747/48 Palnadu Express
12737/38 Lingampally–Kakinada Port Gowthami Express
12793/94 Tirupati–Nizamabad Rayalaseema Express
12775/76 Lingampally-Kakinada Town Cocanada AC Express

Express trains with stops
11019/20 Bhubaneswar–Mumbai CST Konark Express
11303/04 Manuguru–CSMT Kolhapur Express
17001/02 Sainagar Shirdi–Secunderabad Express
17009/10 Bidar–Hyderabad Intercity Express
17013/14 Hyderabad–Pune Express
17017/18 Rajkot–Secunderabad Express
17031/32 Hyderabad–Mumbai Express
17205/06 Sainagar Shirdi–Kakinada Port Express
17207/08 Sainagar Shirdi–Vijayawada Express
19201/02 Secunderabad–Porbandar Weekly Express

Passenger trains with stops
57129/30 Hyderabad–Bijapur-Bolarum Passenger
57155/56 Hyderabad–Gulbarga Passenger
57517/18 Hyderabad–Tandur Passenger
57547/48 Hyderabad–Purna Passenger
57549/50 Hyderabad–Aurangabad Passenger
57605/06 Secunderabad–Vikarabad passenger
57659/60 Falaknuma–Solapur/Gulbarga passenger

Trains passing through without stops
22691/92 Bangalore–Hazrat Nizamuddin Rajdhani Express
12213/14 Yeswantpur–Delhi Sarai Rohilla Duronto Express
12219/20 Secunderabad–Lokmanya Tilak Terminus Duronto Express
15015/16 Gorakhpur–Yesvantpur Express
12731/32 Secunderabad–Tirupati Superfast Express
17203/04 Kakinada–Bhavnagar Express
18519/20 Visakhapatnam–Lokmanya Tilak Terminus Express
22881/82 Pune–Bhubaneswar Superfast Express

Gallery

See also
 Nizam's Guaranteed State Railway

References

External links

MMTS Timings as per South Central Railway
MMTS Train Timings
 

MMTS stations in Hyderabad
Secunderabad railway division